= Volos Municipal Radio =

Volos Municipal Radio (Greek: Δημοτικό Ραδιόφωνο Βόλου, 104.6 FM) was a municipality-owned radio station in Volos, Greece, operating since 1993 until its closure in 2012.
